Ashab-e Olya (also Romanized as Aşḩāb-e ‘Olyā; also known as Aşḩāb) is a village in Hoseynabad-e Shomali Rural District, Saral District, Divandarreh County, Kurdistan Province, Iran. At the 2006 census, its population was 117, in 29 families. The village is populated by Kurds.

References 

Towns and villages in Divandarreh County
Kurdish settlements in Kurdistan Province